Alexei Mitrofanov (born June 11, 1994) is a Russian professional ice hockey forward. He is currently playing with HC Yugra of the Supreme Hockey League (VHL).

Career 
Mitrofanov played 55 games with Tolpar Ufa during the 2013-14 season, scoring 40 goals and 52 assists in to lead the MHL in goals, assists, and points. He was named to the 2013–2014 MHL All-Star Game. The following season, he played two games in the Kontinental Hockey League for Salavat Yulaev Ufa.

Awards and honours

References

External links

1994 births
Living people
HC Khimik Voskresensk players
Russian ice hockey right wingers
Salavat Yulaev Ufa players
Tolpar Ufa players
Toros Neftekamsk players
Tsen Tou Jilin City players
People from Voskresensk
HC Yugra players
Sportspeople from Moscow Oblast